Perdicella is a genus of tropical air-breathing land snails, terrestrial pulmonate gastropod mollusks in the family Achatinellidae. They are endemic to Hawaii and the majority of the species are extinct.

Species
Species within the genus Perdicella include:
 Perdicella carinella
 Perdicella fulgurans
 Perdicella helena
 Perdicella kuhnsi
 Perdicella maniensis
 Perdicella ornata
 Perdicella zebra
 Perdicella zebrina

References

 Nomenclator Zoologicus info

 
Molluscs of Hawaii
Endemic fauna of Hawaii
Gastropod genera
Taxonomy articles created by Polbot